Alice Graham may refer to:

Alice Graham (figure skater), in 2006 Canadian Figure Skating Championships
Alice Graham Underhill